Drukpa Kunley (1455–1529), also known as Kunga Legpai Zangpo, Drukpa Kunleg, and Kunga Legpa, the Madman of the Dragon Lineage , was a Buddhist monk and missionary in the Tibetan Mahamudra tradition, as well as a famous poet, and is often counted among the Nyönpa ("mad ones"). After undergoing training in Ralung Monastery under siddha Pema Lingpa, he introduced an aspect of Vajrayana Buddhism to Bhutan and established the monastery of Chimi Lhakhang there in 1499.

Biography
Drukpa Kunley was born into the branch of the noble Gya clan of Ralung Monastery in the Tsang region of western Tibet, which was descended from Lhabum (lha 'bum), the second eldest brother of Tsangpa Gyare. His father was Rinchen Zangpo and mother was Gomokee. He was nephew to the 2nd Gyalwang Drukpa and father of Ngawang Tenzin and Zhingkyong Drukdra.

He was known for his crazy methods of enlightening other beings, mostly women, which earned him the title "The Saint of 5,000 Women". Among other things, women would seek his blessing in the form of sexual intercourse. His intention was to show that it is possible to be enlightened, impart enlightenment, and still lead a very healthy sex life, and to demonstrate that celibacy was not necessary for being enlightened. In addition, he wanted to expand the range of means by which enlightenment could be imparted, while adding new evolutionary prospects to the overarching tradition. He is credited with introducing the practice of phallus paintings in Bhutan and placing statues of them on rooftops to drive away evil spirits. Because of this power to awaken unenlightened beings, Kunley's penis is referred to as the "Thunderbolt of Flaming Wisdom" and he himself is known as the "fertility saint". For this reason, women from all around the world visited his monastery to seek his blessing.

Some of his most famous performances include urinating on sacred thankhas, stripping down naked or offering his testicles to a famous Lama. He is one of very few Buddhist teachers to almost always appear in Bhutanese paintings topless. It is known that Drukpa Kunley would not bless anyone who came to seek his guidance and help unless they brought a beautiful woman and a bottle of wine. His fertility temple, Chimi Lhakhang, is today filled with the weaved portable wine bottles.

Visitors to Drukpa Kunley's monastery in Bhutan are welcome to enjoy a short trek up a hill. The monastery is very modest, only one smallish building, but it contains a wood-and-ivory lingam through which one can obtain blessings from the monk in residence..

Poems and songs of Drukpa Kunley 

Poem about happiness

I am happy that I am a free Yogi.
So I grow more and more into my inner happiness.
I can have sex with many women,
because I help them to go the path of enlightenment.
Outwardly I'm a fool
and inwardly I live with a clear spiritual system.
Outwardly, I enjoy wine, women and song.
And inwardly I work for the benefit of all beings.
Outwardly, I live for my pleasure
and inwardly I do everything in the right moment.
Outwardly I am a ragged beggar
and inwardly a blissful Buddha.

Song about the pleasure

A young woman finds pleasure in love.
A young man finds pleasure in sex.
An old man finds pleasure in his memoirs.
This is the doctrine of the three pleasures.

Who does not know the truth, is confused.
Those who have no goals, can not sacrifice.
Those who have no courage, can not be a Yogi.
This is the doctrine of the three missing things.

Even if a person knows the way of wisdom;
without practicing there is no realization.
Even if a master shows you the way,
you have to go it by yourself.

The five spiritual ways

I practice the path of self-discipline.
I meditate every day.

I go the way of embracing love.
I work as a mother and father of all beings.

I do the deity yoga.
I visualize myself as a Buddha in the cosmic unity.

I read the books of all religions
and practice all at the right moment.

The life is my teacher
and my inner wisdom is my guide.

Main teachers
 Gyalwang Drukpa II, Gyalwang Kunga Paljor ('brug chen kun dga' dpal 'byor) 1428-1476
 Lhatsun Kunga Chökyi Gyatso (lha btsun kun dga' chos kyi rgya mtsho) 1432-1505
 Pema Lingpa (padma gling pa) 1445-1521

Main lineages
Drukpa Kagyu

Further reading

Notes

References

 Dargey, Y. (2001) History of the Drukpa Kagyud School in Bhutan (Thimphu). . pp 91–110.  
 Dowman, K. & S. Paljor (eds.) (1980) The Divine Madman: the sublime life and songs of Drukpa Kunley (London). .
 Stein, R. A. (1972). Tibetan Civilization. Stanford University Press, Stanford, California.  (cloth);  (pbk).

1455 births
1529 deaths
15th-century Tibetan people
16th-century Tibetan people
15th-century lamas
16th-century lamas
Tibetan Buddhists from Bhutan
Bhutanese lamas
Drukpa Kagyu lamas
Buddhist missionaries